The Westchester County Board of Legislators is the legislative, policy-making branch of Westchester County, New York. The powers of the Board are enumerated in the county's charter. A key power of the Board concerns finances: appropriating funds, approving the budget and levying taxes. It also approves appointments by the County Executive and passes local laws, acts, and resolutions.

The Board's seventeen members, known as Legislators, are elected every two years and each represents a district of approximately 56,000 residents.

Board members
The Board of Legislators has seventeen members, each representing a district of approximately 56,000 residents. As of January 2022, fifteen of them are Democrats, one is a Republican, and one is a Conservative who caucuses as a Republican. On January 3, 2022, Legislator Catherine Borgia, a Democrat, was unanimously elected Chair of the Board. Legislator Nancy E. Barr was elected Vice Chair of the Board.

Committees
The Board of Legislators operates under a committee system. Currently, there are fourteen committees, each of which is charged with overseeing a particular policy area.

The following table reflects Committee chairs during the legislative term of 2022-2023.

References

External links

Westchester County Democratic Committee

Westchester County, New York
County government agencies in New York (state)